Events from the year 1927 in Nicaragua.

Incumbents
President: Adolfo Diaz

Events
May 20 - Pact of Espino Negro
July 16 - Battle of Ocotal
July 25 - Battle of San Fernando
July 27 - Battle of Santa Clara
September 4 - Nicaraguan parliamentary election, 1927
September 16 - Battle of Telpaneca
October 9 - Battle of Sapotillal

Births

Deaths

 
1920s in Nicaragua
Years of the 20th century in Nicaragua
Nicaragua
Nicaragua